The Island Years is a compilation by Ultravox, released in 1999 by PolyGram and Spectrum labels. It contains songs from their three first albums (Ultravox!, Ha! Ha! Ha! and Systems of Romance), when John Foxx was the group's vocalist and frontman, and another two guitarists, Stevie Shears and Robin Simon were with them (although not at the same time). The album is a compilation of the band's early years, before Midge Ure became a member, and the band scored a number of hits in the 1980s.

This is a more modern version of the Slow Motion compilation, released in 1993 by the same labels.

The band are credited as Ultravox!, although the band decided to drop the exclamation mark (!) before recording their Systems Of Romance album.

Track listing
"Dangerous Rhythm"
"My Sex"
"I Want to Be a Machine"
"The Wild, the Beautiful and the Damned"
"Life at Rainbow's End"
"Young Savage"
"Slip Away"
"ROckWrok"
"Hiroshima Mon Amour"
"Distant Smile"
"Man Who Dies Every Day"
"While I'm Still Alive"
"Slow Motion"
"Quiet Men"
"Cross Fade"
"Just for a Moment"

Personnel
 John Foxx – vocals
 Chris Cross – bass, synthesizer, backing vocals
 Warren Cann – drums, percussion, backing vocals
 Billy Currie – violin, keyboards, synthesizer
 Stevie Shears – guitar 1, 3 – 8, 10 – 12
 Robin Simon – guitar 13 and 14

References

1999 compilation albums
Ultravox compilation albums